King is the title given to a male monarch in a variety of contexts. The female equivalent is queen, which title is also given to the consort of a king, although in some cases, the title of King is given to females such as in the case of Mary, Queen of Hungary.

In the context of prehistory, antiquity and contemporary indigenous peoples, the title may refer to tribal kingship. Germanic kingship is cognate with Indo-European traditions of tribal rulership (c.f. Indic rājan, Gothic reiks, and Old Irish rí, etc.).
In the context of classical antiquity, king may translate in Latin as rex and in Greek as archon or basileus.
In classical European feudalism, the title of king as the ruler of a kingdom is understood to be the highest rank in the feudal order, potentially subject, at least nominally, only to an emperor (harking back to the client kings of the Roman Republic and Roman Empire).
In a modern context, the title may refer to the ruler of one of a number of modern monarchies (either absolute or constitutional). The title of king is used alongside other titles for monarchs: in the West, emperor, grand prince, prince, archduke, duke or grand duke, and in the Islamic world, malik, sultan, emir or hakim, etc. 
The city-states of the Aztec Empire had a Tlatoani, which were kings of pre-Hispanic Mesoamerica. The Huey Tlatoani was the emperor of the Aztecs.
The term king may also refer to a king consort, a title that is sometimes given to the husband of a ruling queen, but the title of prince consort is more common.

Etymology

The English term  is derived from the Anglo-Saxon cyning, which in turn is derived from the Common Germanic *kuningaz. It is a derivation from the term *kunjom "kin" (Old English ) by the -inga- suffix. The literal meaning is that of a "scion of the [noble] kin", or perhaps "son or descendant of one of noble birth" (OED).

The English term translates, and is considered equivalent to, Latin rēx and its equivalents in the various European languages. The Germanic term is notably different from the word for "King" in other Indo-European languages (*rēks "ruler"; Latin rēx, Sanskrit rājan and Irish ríg; however, see Gothic reiks and, e.g., modern German Reich and modern Dutch rijk).

History
The English word is of Germanic origin, and historically refers to Germanic kingship, in the pre-Christian period a type of tribal kingship. The monarchies of Europe in the Christian Middle Ages derived their claim from Christianisation and the  divine right of kings, partly influenced by the notion of sacral kingship inherited from  Germanic antiquity.

The Early Middle Ages begin with a fragmentation of the former Western Roman Empire into barbarian kingdoms. In Western Europe, the kingdom of the Franks developed into the Carolingian Empire by the 8th century, and the kingdoms of Anglo-Saxon England were unified into the kingdom of England by the 10th century.

With the breakup of the Carolingian Empire in the 9th century, the system of feudalism places kings at the head of a pyramid of relationships between liege lords and vassals, dependent on the regional rule of barons, and the intermediate positions of counts (or earls) and dukes. The core of European feudal manorialism in the High Middle Ages were the territories of the former Carolingian Empire, i.e. the kingdom of France and the Holy Roman Empire (centered on the nominal kingdoms of Germany and Italy).

In the course of the European Middle Ages, the European kingdoms underwent a general trend of centralisation of power, so that by the Late Middle Ages there were a number of large and powerful kingdoms in Europe, which would develop into the great powers of Europe in the Early Modern period.
In the Iberian Peninsula, the remnants  of the Visigothic Kingdom, the petty kingdoms of Asturias and Pamplona, expanded into the kingdom of Portugal, the Crown of Castile and the Crown of Aragon with the ongoing Reconquista.
In southern Europe, the kingdom of Sicily was established following the Norman conquest of southern Italy. The Kingdom of Sardinia was claimed as a separate title held by the Crown of Aragon  in 1324. In the Balkans, the Kingdom of Serbia was established in 1217.
In central Europe, the Kingdom of Hungary was established in AD 1000 following the Christianisation of the Magyars. The kingdoms of Poland and Bohemia were established within the Holy Roman Empire in 1025 and 1198, respectively. 
In eastern Europe, the Grand Duchy of Moscow did not technically claim the status of kingdom until the early modern Tsardom of Russia.
In northern Europe, the tribal kingdoms of the Viking Age by the 11th century expanded into the North Sea Empire under Cnut the Great,  king of Denmark, England and Norway. The Christianization of Scandinavia resulted in "consolidated" kingdoms of Sweden and Norway, and by the end of the medieval period the pan-Scandinavian Kalmar Union.

Contemporary kings

Currently, fifteen kings are recognized as the heads of state of sovereign states (i.e. English king is used as official translation of the respective native titles held by the monarchs).

Most of these are heads of state of constitutional monarchies; kings ruling over absolute monarchies are the King of Saudi Arabia, the King of Bahrain and the King of Eswatini.

See also

Anointing
Big man (anthropology)
Buddhist kingship
Client king
Coronation
Designation
Divine right of kings
Germanic kingship
Great King
High King
King consort
King of Kings
Petty king
Queen
Realm
Royal and noble ranks
Royal family
Sacred king
Tribal kingship
Titles translated as "king"
Archon
Basileus
Lugal
Kabaka
Mepe (title)
Malik/Melekh
Mwami
Negus
Oba
Raja
Rex (king)
Rí
Tlatoani
Shah
Tagavor

Notes

References

External links

Royal titles
 
Gendered occupations